Víctor Quiñones Hernández (June 30, 1959 – April 2, 2006) was a Puerto Rican professional wrestling promoter, manager, and the founder and owner of International Wrestling Association in Japan, as well as the later International Wrestling Association in Puerto Rico.

Early life
Quiñones' mother ran several businesses and his stepfather was a lawyer and politician and they raised him to be savvy and entrepreneurial.  Being bilingual, he became an asset to the Puerto Rican wrestling office at a young age, helping out Gorilla Monsoon and others when they came to the island. After his mother died, Quiñones moved to the United States in 1979, where he lived with Gorilla Monsoon until 1984. In 1984, Capitol Sports went bankrupt and Quiñones bought a quarter interest in the World Wrestling Council company.

Professional wrestling career
Quiñones was primarily a manager for The Headhunters and Mr. Pogo, but was affiliated with Terry Funk, Mike Awesome, Hisakatsu Oya and Cactus Jack in the stable Funk Masters of Wrestling on Frontier Martial-Arts Wrestling (FMW) from 1996 to 1997. He also became official manager for Taka Michinoku for one time only, when he assisted him to fought his own mentor The Great Sasuke on 4th Anniversary of Michinoku Pro after Taka won WWF Light Heavyweight Championship from Brian Christopher at D-Generation X: In Your House in 1997.

Quiñones was one of the prominent managers of the pioneering hardcore wrestling promotion Frontier Martial-Arts Wrestling, and also was the picador of Shocker & founder and owner of two hardcore wrestling promotions in Japan; Wrestling International New Generations (W*ING) and International Wrestling Association of Japan (IWA Japan).

In July 1988 when Bruiser Brody was stabbed in Puerto Rico, Quiñones had to call a radio station, to broadcast that they needed an ambulance urgently and a local ambulance driver heard the call over the radio at a local restaurant and made his way to the scene.

Quiñones retained strong connections with many professional wrestling federations outside Puerto Rico, and was known for his extraordinary booking/promoting faculty. He was a very rich person and took very good care of wrestlers. Japanese wrestler Taka Michinoku was heavily helped by Quiñones when he had been to outside Japan. Thanks to Quiñones, he could wrestle in ECW, WWF (USA), AAA (Mexico), IWA (Puerto Rico), FMW (Japan), and he has stated that without Quiñones' help, he wouldn't be able to start Kaientai Dojo and that Quiñones was like a father to him. Kintaro Kanemura reminisced about Quiñones as "If I didn't meet him, maybe I would die in the middle of America" (when he first arrived in North America, he had only ¢20). Mitsunobu Kikuzawa described Quiñones as the No.1 promoter in the world. Tajiri has referred to Quiñones as his biggest mentor in wrestling.

On April 2, 2006, Quiñones died in his home in San Juan, Puerto Rico. Soon after the death, several Japanese federations and wrestlers, including Taka Michinoku and Tajiri, paid tribute to him by having special ceremonies.

Personal life 
Quiñones was the son of professional wrestler Robert "Gorilla Monsoon" Marella.

References

External links
 Article on Quiñones' death.

1959 births
2006 deaths
People from San Juan, Puerto Rico
Professional wrestling managers and valets
Professional wrestling promoters
Professional wrestling referees